Thyrgis lacryma is a moth in the subfamily Arctiinae. It was described by Paul Dognin in 1919. It is found in French Guiana.

References

Natural History Museum Lepidoptera generic names catalog

Moths described in 1919
Arctiinae